Yacine Aliane (born 21 January 1999) is an Algerian footballer who plays for ASO Chlef in the Algerian Ligue Professionnelle 1.

Career
In 2020, Aliane was promoted to USM Alger's first team.

On 16 January 2021, Aliane made his first league appearance against RC Relizane.

References

External links
 

1999 births
Living people
Algerian footballers
USM Alger players
Algerian Ligue Professionnelle 1 players
Association football wingers
21st-century Algerian people